WMJC (91.9 FM) is a radio station broadcasting a Christian format as an affiliate of the Strong Tower Radio. WMJC is licensed to Richland, Michigan, United States. WMJC is simulcast on a translator in Kalamazoo, 97.3 W247AM.

History
The station began broadcasting in 2008, holding the call sign WTNP, and was owned by Horizon Broadcasting Network. The station's call sign was changed to WMJC on May 1, 2011. Soon thereafter, the station was sold to Calvary Radio Network, Inc. for $75,000. Effective July 19, 2021, the station was sold to West Central Michigan Media Ministries, along with its translator 97.3 W247AM, for $150,000, and it became an affiliate of Strong Tower Radio.

References

External links
Official Website

Radio stations established in 2008
2008 establishments in Michigan
MJC